The Kaindl Hut is a privately run mountain hut at a height of  in the Kaiser mountains in the Austrian state of Tyrol.

Location 
The Kaindl Hut lies in the western part of the Kaiser on an Alpine meadow, the Steinbergalm, and at the foot of the Zettenkaiser, Scheffauer and Hackenköpfe mountains. North of the Kaindl Hut is the rather unimpressive Gamskogel (1,448 m) and the wooded ridge of the Brentenjoch. The hut is located in the Wilder Kaiser nature reserve.

Access 
by car on the A12 (Austria) and A93 (Germany) motorway to the Kufstein Nord exit and then to the valley station of the Kaiser Lift, or to Kufstein Mitterndorf to the car park on the edge of the wood.
by rail to Kufstein railway station and then on foot to the start of the trail in Kienbichl.

Approaches 
There are several possible approaches to the Kaindl Hut:
from the valley station of the chair lift in Kufstein via the Brentenjoch in 2.5 hours.
from the "Aschenbrenner" mountain inn in 1.5 hours, also possible by bicycle.
from the Hintersteiner See near Scheffau via the Walleralm in 2.5 hours.
from Kufstein-Sparchen (Josef Madersperger monument) via the Duxeralm and Gamskogel in 3 hours.
The chair lift to Brentenjoch, from where the hut is reached in 40 minutes with little elevation gain, was closed in 2012 but re-opened in May 2015. The journey takes about 20 minutes and takes passengers to a height of 1,200 m.

Crossings 
 Anton Karg Haus or  Hans Berger Haus in the Kaisertal via the  Bettlersteig trail, medium difficulty, duration: 2.5 hours.
 Grutten Hut via the Hochegg, Walleralm and Wilder Kaiser Trail, easy, duration: 5 hours.

Tour options 
To the north is a gently sloping valley bowl, that is surrounded by rolling grass-covered mountains (‘’Grasbergen’’). Here there are many scenic and easy walks. Destinations, which can be taken in as part of a full day’s round trip, are the Brentenjoch, Gamskogel and Brandkogel. To the south, by contrast, are the jagged rock faces of the Wilder Kaiser.

 Scheffauer (2,111 m) along the Widauersteig  trail in 2.5 hours (UIAA climbing grade I).
 Zettenkaiser (1,968 m) via the Kleinen Friedhof and the  normal route in 2 hours (UIAA II).
 Hackenköpfe (2,126 m) and Sonneck via the Widauersteig and Scheffauer, difficult ridge crossing.
 various Alpine climbing routes (some for sport-climbers) on the north faces of the Scheffauer and Zettenkaiser.
 Climbing garden near the hut.

References 

Mountain huts in Tyrol (state)
Kaiser Mountains